Billy Joe Padden is a Gaelic footballer from County Mayo, Ireland. He began his playing career with Belmullet GAC and played at all levels for the Mayo county team.

He subsequently moved to County Armagh, joining St Patrick's Carrickcruppen GFC and playing at senior level for the Armagh county team. He is a son of Mayo legend Willie Joe Padden.

He has done media work, including for Off the Ball and Sky Sports.

References

Year of birth missing (living people)
Living people
Armagh inter-county Gaelic footballers
Belmullet Gaelic footballers
Carrickcuppen Gaelic footballers
Gaelic football forwards
Gaelic games writers and broadcasters
Mayo inter-county Gaelic footballers